The Flight from Love (German: Die Flucht vor der Liebe) is a 1929 German silent film directed by Hans Behrendt and starring Friedrich Benfer, Paul Otto and Kurt Vespermann. It was shot at the Babelsberg Studios in Berlin and on location in Austria. The film's art direction was by Willi Herrmann.

Cast
Friedrich Benfer as Mario von Hollberg  
Paul Otto as Franz von Hollberg, Vater  
Kurt Vespermann as Henry von Nostitz, Attaché  
Vera Schmiterlöw as Thea, seine Schwester  
Kurt Gerron as Max Ruppke  
Jenny Jugo as Marga, seine Tochter  
Paul Heidemann as Gustav Beibernitz  
Kurt Willuschat as Emil, Artistenlehrling  
Hermann Stetza as Schlangenmensch Huddeldinuddel

References

External links

Films of the Weimar Republic
Films directed by Hans Behrendt
German silent feature films
UFA GmbH films
German black-and-white films
Films shot at Babelsberg Studios
Films shot in Austria